3-2-1, Rattle Battle!, known in Japan as , is a video game for WiiWare developed by Tecmo. It was released in Japan on March 31, 2009, the PAL regions on August 14, 2009 and in North America on August 31, 2009.

Gameplay
3-2-1, Rattle Battle! is a collection of twelve minigames that generally revolve around players shaking the Wii Remote in order to score points. Controlling a blue cartoon mascot named "Rattle Hero", shaking the Wii Remote causes him to perform a different action depending on the minigame. These include firing a laser beam to dispatch enemies, bouncing up and down to weigh down a scale and growing or shrinking in size to dodge a salvo of arrows. Each minigame lasts between just three seconds to around two minutes in length.

The game features online leaderboards for high scores for two of the minigames.

Development
A prototype for 3-2-1, Rattle Battle!, then titled Playshake, was demonstrated at the 2009 Tokyo Game Show. The prototype featured minimal graphics and only a single minigame in which the player had to shake the Wii Remote as many times as they can in three seconds.

References

External links
 

2009 video games
Action video games
Koei Tecmo games
Single-player video games
Video games developed in Japan
Wii-only games
WiiWare games